Key Witness may refer to:

Key Witness (1947 film)
Key Witness (1960 film)
Key Witness (book)